Gagna (Gáɲàgà) is a village and seat (chef-lieu) of the rural commune of Derary in the Cercle of Djenné in the Mopti Region of southern-central Mali.

Tommo So is spoken in the village. The local surname is Kanambaye.

References

External links
.

Populated places in Mopti Region